Malcolm Charles Salaman (6 September 1855 – 22 January 1940) was an English author, journalist and critic. He was born and died in London.

Life
He was educated at University College School and at Owens College, Manchester. Although he had studied mechanical engineering for four years, he became a journalist, and edited two weekly papers. His critical writing was devoted chiefly to prints and to plays. From 1883 to 1894 he was dramatic and art critic for the Sunday Times, and from 1890 to 1899 was on the staff of The Graphic. He wrote regularly on prints for the art magazines The Studio and Apollo.

Salaman also wrote the introductions to the 33 volume series Modern Masters of Etching published between 1925 and 1932 by The Studio, each of which contained reproductions of 12 prints by a great etcher. This series included volumes on Frank Brangwyn, Alphonse Legros, Ernest Stephen Lumsden, Malcolm Osborne and Edmund Blampied.

He married Annie Sarah Isaac in 1914. They had no children.

Works
Among his numerous writings are:  
 Ivan's Love Quest and Other Poems (1879)
 Woman through a Man's Eyeglass (1892)
 The Old Engravers of England (1906)
 Old English Color Prints (1909)
 Old English Mezzotints (1910)
 Modern Etchings (British) (1912)
 French Colour-Prints of the Eighteenth Century (1913)

Salaman edited the plays of Sir A. W. Pinero (1891–1900) and himself wrote several plays.

References

Sources

External links
 
 Malcolm Charles Salaman

English male journalists
English art critics
Writers from London
1855 births
1940 deaths